Niklas 'Niki' Ajo (born 10 July 1994, in Valkeakoski) is a Finnish former Grand Prix motorcycle racer, and the 2009 champion of the Finnish 125GP Championship. Ajo has also competed in the Red Bull MotoGP Rookies Cup and the Spanish 125GP Championship.

Career statistics

Grand Prix motorcycle racing

By season

Races by year
(key) (Races in bold indicate pole position, races in italics indicate fastest lap)

References

External links

1994 births
Living people
Finnish motorcycle racers
125cc World Championship riders
Moto3 World Championship riders
People from Valkeakoski
Sportspeople from Pirkanmaa